Dead Horse Ranch State Park is a state park of Arizona, United States, on the Verde River in an area known as the Verde River Greenway. It also offers trailhead access to the Dead Horse Trail System, located on adjacent Coconino National Forest land. The ranch was originally named by the Ireys family, who sold the land to the state of Arizona to become a state park.

Special events
The annual Verde Valley Birding and Nature Festival, the "Birdy Verde", with emphasis on birdwatching, is held each April. In 2010, about 70 field trips were offered for the four-day event, many led by nationally recognized experts. Headquarters for the festival is at Dead Horse Ranch, but events are held throughout the Verde Valley.

Another popular yearly event at Dead Horse Ranch State Park is Verde River Day, which is held annually in September to celebrate the protection of the river's riparian habitat.

References

External links
Dead Horse Ranch State Park

State parks of Arizona
Parks in Yavapai County, Arizona
Coconino National Forest
Protected areas established in 1972
1972 establishments in Arizona